Walter Fabián Zermatten  (born 14 October 1971 in Isidro Casanova) is an Argentine footballer who coaches the River Plate PR in the Puerto Rico Soccer League. He is married and is the father of two. As a player, he made his professional debut at the age of 21. After playing for the River Plate PR he became their coach in 2009.

Club career
Zermatten previously played for Argentinos Juniors in the Primera División Argentina. He also had a spell with Deportivo Quito in Serie A de Ecuador.

References

Club Atlético River Plate Puerto Rico
1971 births
Living people
People from La Matanza Partido
Argentine footballers
Argentinos Juniors footballers
Argentine Primera División players
Instituto footballers
Club Atlético Banfield footballers
Expatriate footballers in Mexico
Argentine expatriate sportspeople in Mexico
S.D. Quito footballers
Querétaro F.C. footballers
Expatriate footballers in Ecuador
Expatriate footballers in Venezuela
The Strongest players
Expatriate footballers in Bolivia
Argentine expatriate footballers
C.D. Técnico Universitario footballers
Argentine expatriate sportspeople in Venezuela
Argentine expatriate sportspeople in Bolivia
Association football midfielders
Sportspeople from Buenos Aires Province